Robert Henry Ossoff is an American physician-scientist and otolaryngologist. He is a professor emeritus at Vanderbilt University Medical Center where he previously held the Guy M. Maness Professorship of Laryngology and Voice.

Education 
Ossoff completed a B.A. at Bowdoin College in 1969. He earned a Doctor of Dental Medicine (1973) and Doctor of Medicine (1975) at Tufts University. He completed a internship at Northwestern Memorial Hospital. Ossoff was a resident in otorhinolaryngology and oral and maxillofacial surgery at the Feinberg School of Medicine. He was a research fellow in otolaryngology and maxillofacial surgery at the and clinical fellow in head and neck surgery at the National Institutes of Health. In 1981, Ossoff completed a M.S. in otolaryngology at Northwestern University.

Career 
Ossoff was a junior faculty clinical fellow at the American Cancer Society Northwestern Medical School through 1984. He became a faculty member in 1986.

Ossoff joined the Vanderbilt University Medical Center faculty in July 1986. He worked in various positions at Vanderbilt. Ossoff was the first director of the Vanderbilt Bill Wilkerson Center for Otolaryngology and Communication Sciences. He was "associate vice chancellor for Health Affairs, chief of staff for Vanderbilt University Adult Hospital, assistant vice chancellor of Compliance and Corporate Integrity and executive medical director for the Vanderbilt Voice Center." Through his career, Ossoff worked closely with James Duncavage, James Netterville, David Zealear, and Gaelyn Garrett.

Ossoff was the first Guy M. Maness Professor of Laryngology and Voice. He was chair of otolaryngology and founded the Vanderbilt Voice Center in 1991. He retired November 3, 2018.

References

External links
 

Living people
Place of birth missing (living people)
Year of birth missing (living people)
20th-century American physicians
21st-century American physicians
Bowdoin College alumni
Physician-scientists
Tufts University School of Medicine alumni
Feinberg School of Medicine alumni
Northwestern University faculty
Vanderbilt University faculty
American otolaryngologists